Route 165 is a -long north–south secondary highway in the western New Brunswick, Canada. 

The route's northern terminus is in downtown Woodstock, New Brunswick at Route 103, where the road is known as Main Street. From there, it runs south along the western bank of the Saint John River to the small community of Meductic. From there, the highway stops following the Saint John River and takes a slight southern turn which brings it to its terminus at an intersection with Route 2 (exit 212) and Route 122.

History

Route 165 was created in 2003 upon the opening of a new twinned stretch of Route 2 (the Trans-Canada Highway). It consists of an "orphaned" section of Route 2 between Meductic and Bulls Creek, with connections along a former stretch of Route 103 from Bulls Creek to Woodstock and a small section of former Route 122 in Meductic.

River crossings
Bulls Creek in Bulls Creek
Eel River in Meductic

Communities along the Route
 Woodstock
 Lower Woodstock
 Woodstock First Nation
 Bulls Creek
 Flemmington
 Hay Settlement
 Hillman
 Riceville
 Meductic

See also
List of New Brunswick provincial highways

References

165
165
165
Woodstock, New Brunswick
Former segments of the Trans-Canada Highway